Jõesuu is a village in Hiiumaa Parish, Hiiu County in northwestern Estonia.

The village is first mentioned in 1913 (Іоэсуу). Historically, the village was part of Kõrgessaare Manor.

The village is located at the mouth of Vanajõgi River.

References
 

Villages in Hiiu County